Nicolai Friis (1815–1888) was a Norwegian politician.

Growing up in a family of thirteen, he was the son of priest Søren Hjelm Friis and brother of professor Jens Andreas Friis and geologist Jacob Pavels Friis.

Nicolai Friis was chaplain in Førde in 1840, and served as mayor of the municipality for a period of ten years. In 1853 he founded the local library with a fund grant from the state. He served as a deputy representative to the Norwegian Parliament in 1854, and later during the term 1862–1863, representing Buskerud whereto he had moved. Died at Eidsvoll in 1888.

References
Nicolai Friis at NRK Sogn og Fjordane County Encyclopedia 

1815 births
1888 deaths
Deputy members of the Storting
Mayors of places in Sogn og Fjordane
People from Førde